Vilis is a Latvian masculine given name and may refer to:
Vilis Daudziņš (b. 1970), Latvian theater and film actor
Vilis Janums (1894–1981), Latvian military officer 
Vilis Krištopans (b. 1954), Latvian politician, former Prime Minister of Latvia
Vilis Lācis (1904–1966), Latvian writer and communist politician
Vilis Olavs (1867–1917), Latvian political theorist, writer, and humanitarian 

Other uses
"Vili's" is the trading name of Vili Milisits, South Australian baker, businessman and philanthropist

Latvian masculine given names